West Amherst is a small community in the Canadian province of Nova Scotia, located  in Hants County.

References
West Amherst on Destination Nova Scotia

Communities in Cumberland County, Nova Scotia
General Service Areas in Nova Scotia